Amelia Hotham (c 1776 – 1812) was a British watercolour painter.

She was the daughter of Susannah Hankey and Beaumont, 2nd Lord Hotham. She married John Woodcock in 1798.

Her watercolour painting Riverside landscape with a castle in the distance, dated 1793, was included in the 1905 book Women Painters of the World.

References

1770s births
1812 deaths
British painters
British women painters